Capra is the name of a traditional Romanian dance, performed around New Year. It's executed by a young man with a goat mask and a sheep skin on his back. The 'goat' and his companions go from house to house, dancing at each door on New Year's Eve. This custom is first mentioned in Descriptio Moldaviae by Dimitrie Cantemir.

During the XIXth century, Romanians believed goats could predict the year's weather, and the Capra dance, considered a pagan dance, became a ritual to bring fertility. It has become a component of folklore culture.

See also 
Kukeri
Hoodening
Folklore of Italy

References 

Romanian culture
Italian folklore